WNEQ (90.3 MHz FM) is a Christian radio station licensed to Taylortown, New Jersey, serving northern Morris County, New Jersey.  The station is owned by Redeemer Broadcasting, Inc.

References

External links
 

NEQ